Kaz Edward Grala (born December 29, 1998) is an American professional stock car racing driver. He competes full-time in the NASCAR Xfinity Series, driving the No. 26 Toyota Supra for Sam Hunt Racing and part-time in the NASCAR Craftsman Truck Series, driving the No. 1 Toyota Tundra for TRICON Garage. He has also previously competed in the NASCAR Cup Series, NASCAR Pinty's Series as well as what are now the ARCA Menards Series, ARCA Menards Series East and ARCA Menards Series West.

Grala is the youngest NASCAR winner in the history of Daytona International Speedway with his win in the 2017 Truck Series season-opener at age 18 and the youngest person to ever compete in an International Motor Sports Association (IMSA) event at age 15.

Racing career

Early career
Grala, a native of Boston, started racing go-karts at F1 Boston in Braintree, Massachusetts, when he was four years old. When he was ten, he began racing Bandoleros, winning the Summer Shootout Championship in 2011. That same year, he won the New York Legendstock and the Massachusetts Bandolero Outlaws state championships. In 2012, Grala won 15 races and the Winter Heat Championship at Charlotte in the Legend Car Pro Division.

In 2013, Grala made his late model debut in UARA-STARS, becoming the youngest winner in series history at Hickory Motor Speedway, followed by setting the record as the youngest driver to lead laps in the Myrtle Beach 400 where he finished second to Lee Pulliam. That same year, he was named by Speed 51 as the 2013 JEGS Rookie of the Year.

NASCAR

2014–2016

In 2014, Grala competed in the NASCAR Whelen All-American Series and won at Caraway Speedway and Martinsville Speedway and also joined Turner Scott Motorsports to compete full-time in the K&N Pro Series East. He was the youngest driver in the series that year.

In 2015, he joined Ben Kennedy Racing to race full-time in the K&N Pro Series East once again.

In 2016, Grala made his NASCAR Gander Outdoors Truck Series debut at Martinsville for GMS Racing, driving the No. 33 Chevrolet. Grala would get his first career top-ten finish at Dover International Speedway in just his second start in the series. With Ben Kennedy joining the team, Grala moved over to the No. 24 truck to compete in seven more races that year.

2017
Grala ran the full Truck Series season in 2017 for GMS in their No. 33 Chevrolet. After avoiding all the crashes at Daytona International Speedway, he won his first race in the series after starting on the pole, making him both the youngest driver to win a NASCAR pole at Daytona and the youngest driver to win a NASCAR race at Daytona (18 years, 1 month and 26 days). It was Grala's first win in NASCAR and essentially locked him into a spot in the Playoffs for the Truck Series in 2017. Grala almost won at Canadian Tire Motorsport Park in September, after leading the closing laps and then in one of the final corners he was tapped and spun around by Austin Cindric. Grala was eliminated from the Playoffs before the Round of 6 due to an early crash in the cutoff race at Talladega Superspeedway, which ultimately resulted in him finishing the season 7th in the Truck Series standings.

2018–2022

On November 15, 2017, it was announced that Grala would join JGL Racing full-time in the NASCAR Xfinity Series as a 2018 Sunoco Rookie of the Year contender, driving the No. 24 Ford. Grala finished fourth in his debut at Daytona. However, on May 15, the team shut down the No. 24 program, leaving Grala without a ride. Three days later, Grala announced he would run the next four Xfinity races for Fury Race Cars, driving the No. 61 Mustang beginning at Charlotte Motor Speedway. Grala drove to an impressive 10th-place finish in FURY's debut as a team. With sponsorship support from IT Coalition, DMB Financial, Kiklos, and HotScream, Grala was able to add another eight races to his schedule beyond the original four. Grala's best finish with the organization was a top-five at Daytona International Speedway, which he achieved in a 10-year-old borrowed car slated to be retired as a show car.
In 2019, Grala joined Richard Childress Racing's No. 21 Xfinity car for a part-time schedule. He was originally going to run part-time with FURY with the amassed sponsorship, but Grala took the sponsorship to RCR to lower costs. He stayed with the team for the 2020 season.

Grala's 2020 schedule began in July at Kansas, where he finished 13th. He ran the next race at Road America and tied his career-best fourth-place finish. In 2020, Grala joined Niece Motorsports for a one-off race at Talladega as a replacement for Natalie Decker. In August 2020, a week after his Xfinity start at Road America, Grala was called by RCR to substitute for Austin Dillon in their No. 3 NASCAR Cup Series car at the Daytona road course after Dillon tested positive for COVID-19. The Go Bowling 235 would see Grala finish seventh in his Cup debut.

Grala joined Kaulig Racing in 2021 for a multi-race schedule that included the Daytona 500, driving the No. 16. At the 2021 Coke Zero Sugar 400 at Daytona, he suffered a foot injury from one of the race's accidents. Grala returned to the Truck Series again in 2021, driving for Young's Motorsports at the Daytona Road Course in their No. 02, replacing Kris Wright, the full-time driver of that truck.

On January 24, 2022, Alpha Prime Racing announced that Grala would drive for them in four races and be the team's reserve driver. On April 12, Big Machine Racing announced that he would drive for them at Talladega and Dover. Grala became The Money Team Racing's first official driver in the team's debut at the 2022 Daytona 500. On lap 40 of the race, he lost his right rear wheel and tire, but he finished the race in 26th place.On February 3, 2022, Young's Motorsports confirmed that Grala would return to the team to run 11 races in the team's No. 02 truck, sharing the ride with Jesse Little.

2023–present

On December 8, 2022, Sam Hunt Racing announced that Grala would compete full-time for them in 2023, driving the No. 26 Toyota GR Supra, with sponsorship to be announced at a later date.

Other racing

In 2014, Grala ran in the Continental Tire SportsCar Challenge, where he became the youngest driver ever to compete in an International Motor Sports Association (IMSA) event at the age of 15 years and one week old.

In 2016, Grala competed in his first Rolex 24 Hours of Daytona for Change Racing alongside former Rolex 24 winners Spencer Pumpelly and Justin Marks, in addition to race newcomer Corey Lewis; at the age of 17, Grala was the youngest driver in the field.

On July 2, 2022, Grala won the Trans-Am Series TA/GT race at Road America, driving the No. 2 Technique Chassis Steel-It Weaver Racing Dodge Challenger.  This was only Grala's second start in the series and second consecutive pole and track record.  In the previous race, at Mid-Ohio Sports Car Course, Grala was leading when his car suffered a mechanical failure.

Personal life
Grala was born in Boston and grew up in the suburb of Westborough. Grala's father Darius is a former sports car racer, competing in the 24 Hours of Daytona three times. He is of Polish ancestry.

He attended high school at Worcester Academy, graduating in 2017. Grala has been accepted to Georgia Tech to major in engineering, but has deferred his admission to pursue his racing career.

Grala lives in Mooresville, North Carolina.

Motorsports career results

NASCAR
(key) (Bold – Pole position awarded by qualifying time. Italics – Pole position earned by points standings or practice time. * – Most laps led.)

Cup Series

Daytona 500

Xfinity Series

Craftsman Truck Series

 Season still in progress
 Ineligible for series points
 Switched from Cup to Truck points on May 4

K&N Pro Series East

K&N Pro Series West

Pinty's Series

ARCA Racing Series
(key) (Bold – Pole position awarded by qualifying time. Italics – Pole position earned by points standings or practice time. * – Most laps led.)

WeatherTech SportsCar Championship
(key)

24 Hours of Daytona

References

External links

 
 

Living people
1998 births
People from Westborough, Massachusetts
Worcester Academy alumni
NASCAR drivers
24 Hours of Daytona drivers
Racing drivers from Boston
Racing drivers from Massachusetts
ARCA Menards Series drivers
Sportspeople from Worcester County, Massachusetts
Richard Childress Racing drivers
Michelin Pilot Challenge drivers
American people of Polish descent